Jean Aubert was a French engineer. In 1961 he used the idea of the German engineer Julius Greve from the last century to describe a pente d'eau, which was a way of moving boats up the gradient of a canal without locks.  The design consisted of a sloping channel through which a wedge of water on which the boat was floating could be pushed up an incline.  This concept was used in both the Montech water slope and the Fonserannes water slopes.

Education
Lycée Louis-le-Grand in Paris.
1913 - École Polytechnique.  Soon left for service in First world war. Returned in 1919.
1920-1922 - École nationale des ponts et chaussées.
University of Paris (Bachelor of law).

Career
1922-1932 - Engineer in charge of the navigation works in Paris.
1932-1961 - Professor in the Chair of Internal Navigation at the École nationale des ponts et chaussées. 
1933-1945 - General manager and later chairman of the Compagnie Nationale du Rhône.
1945-1953 - Chairman of the electricity board of the Société Nationale des Chemins de fer Français
1949-1967 -  Chairman of the Rhine Navigation Company 
years unknown - Chairman of the Société de Construction des Batignolles.
years unknown - President, Societe des Ingenieurs Civils de France.
years unknown - Inspecteur Général des Ponts et Chaussées 
1966-unknown - Consulting engineer and honorary chairman of Spie Batignolles.
Chairman of several other companies.

Publications
In 1919 he published La Probabilité dans les tires de guerre and was awarded the Pierson-Perrim prize by the Académie des Sciences in 1922.
His article Philosophie de la pente d'eau appeared in the journal Travaux in 1984 when he was 90 years old.
In 1961 he published his revolutionary ideas on the pente d'eau, or water slope, which was designed to transfer barges from one level to another without the use of locks.

Awards
Croix de Guerre in 1916.
Académie des Sciences: Prix Pierson-Perrim 1922.
Awarded the Caméré prize in 1934 by the Académie des Sciences for a new type of movable dam.
Ingénieur Général des Ponts et Chaussées 1951,
Commandeur de la Légion d'honneur 1960.

Principle works
Construction of the Pont Edouard-Herriort on the Rhône at Lyon.
Design and construction of the Génissiat dam and Lonzères-Mondragon dam on the Rhône.
Conception and design of the Denouval dam on the Seine near Andrésy, completed in 1980.

Further reading
David Tew, 1984, Canal Inclines and Lifts, Gloucester: Alan Sutton.

References

1894 births
1984 deaths
20th-century French engineers
Canal inclined planes
Engineers from Paris
University of Paris alumni
École Polytechnique alumni
École des Ponts ParisTech alumni
Lycée Louis-le-Grand alumni